Saucisson, also saucisson sec or saucisse sèche, is a family of thick, dry-cured sausages in French cuisine. Typically made of pork, or a mixture of pork and other meats, saucisson are a type of charcuterie similar to salami or summer sausage.

There is also a tradition of making saucisse sèche in western Switzerland.

Origin 
Saucisson comes from the Latin  meaning salted. There are saucisson recipes dating from Roman times, and Gaulish recipes for dried pork.

The word saucisson first appeared in France in 1546 in the Tiers Livre of Rabelais.

Production

Stuffing 
Saucisson stuffing is generally made of two-thirds to three-quarters lean meat and the rest fat (largely pork back-fat called ). The mixture is ground to different fineness depending on the type of saucisson and mixed with salt, sugar, spices, nitrites and/or saltpeter, and with fermenting bacteria. For instance, antilisterial strains of Lactobacillus sakei are used in Europe for the production of saucisson and can be used for the conservation of fresh meat.

Some versions of saucisson also contain pepper seeds, garlic, mushrooms, bits of dried fruits or nuts (such as pistachios, figs, or olives), cheeses such as Roquefort, Laguiole, or alcohols such as wines or Génépi liquor.

See also 
List of sausages
Saucisson de Lyon

Further reading

References 

French sausages
Pork
Fermented sausages